Barwa is a village in West Champaran district in the Indian state of Bihar. It is located in the Narkatiaganj block.

Demographics
 India census, Barwa had a population of 2110 in 342 households. Males constitute 53.69% of the population and females 46.3%. Barwa has an average literacy rate of 46.58%, lower than the national average of 74%: male literacy is 58.59%, and female literacy is 41.4%. In Barwa, 17.86% of the population is under 6 years of age.

References

Villages in West Champaran district